Po Lam Estate is a mixed TPS and public housing estate in Tseung Kwan O, New Territories, Hong Kong, near Metro City and MTR Po Lam station. It is the first public housing estate in Tseung Kwan O and has a total of seven residential blocks with 5,272 units. Some of the flats were sold to tenants through Tenants Purchase Scheme Phase 6A in 2004.

Ying Ming Court and Yan Ming Court are Home Ownership Scheme housing courts in Tseung Kwan O near Po Lam Estate, built in 1989 and 1990 respectively.

Houses

Po Lam Estate

Ying Ming Court

Yan Ming Court

Demographics
According to the 2016 by-census, Po Lam Estate had a population of 15,319, Ying Ming Court had a population of 5,058 while Yan Ming Court had a population of 4,604. Altogether the population amounts to 24,981.

Politics
For the 2019 District Council election, the estate fell within two constituencies. Po Lam Estate falls within the Po Lam constituency, which was formerly represented by Fung Kwan-on until July 2021, while Ying Ming Court and Yan Ming Court falls within the Yan Ying constituency, which was formerly represented by Ben Chung Kam-lun until May 2021.

See also

Public housing estates in Tseung Kwan O

References

Residential buildings completed in 1988
Po Lam
Public housing estates in Hong Kong
Tenants Purchase Scheme
Residential buildings completed in 2001